Narayanapuram is a village and panchayat in Balijipeta mandal of Parvathipuram Manyam district, Andhra Pradesh, India.

History
Sri Nilakanteswara Temple was constructed by a Kalinga king of the Eastern Ganga dynasty in the tenth century. There are four temples in the complex on the west bank of River Suvarnamukhi.

References

Villages in Parvathipuram Manyam district